"Not Too Young, Not Too Old" is a pop song recorded by singer Aaron Carter. Produced by Scorpio and Mystery, the track was released in September 2001 as the second single off Carter's third album Oh Aaron. "Not Too Young, Not Too Old" is Carter's second song to feature vocals from his older brother Nick, who sings the chorus. The song failed to appear on any Billboard charts but managed to reach number 80 in Australia.

Sample used
The song samples "B to the I" by Billie and uses the Auto-Tune effect.

Music video
A music video was produced to promote the single and was directed by Andrew MacNaughtan (who previously directed three other Aaron Carter videos). The video features Aaron and his brother fooling around with each other and with girls while dancing in front of a big neon sign of Aaron's name.

Live performances
Aaron performed the song by himself on the Nickelodeon show All That during the first episode of Season 7. He performed the song with his brother at the 2001 Teen Choice Awards where Aaron, dressed in a combat outfit, performed on a life-size record player and Nick coming out as a bohemian pirate.

Credits and personnel
Credits adapted from the liner notes of Oh Aaron.

Recording
Recorded at Westlake Audio, Los Angeles
Recorded and mixed at Battery Studios, New York

Personnel
Scorpio – producer
Mystery – producer
Bill Malina – recording engineer
Chris Trevett – recording engineer, mix engineer
Rowie Nameri – assistant recording engineer
Jason Rankins – assistant recording engineer
Larry "Rock" Campbell – all instruments
Taylur Davis – background vocals
Dana Williams – background vocals
Davida Williams – background vocals

Chart performance

References

External links

2001 singles
2001 songs
Aaron Carter songs
Nick Carter (musician) songs
Jive Records singles
Music videos directed by Andrew MacNaughtan
Songs written by Lucas Secon